

Events

Pre-1600
 363 – The Roman emperor Julian defeats the Sasanian army in the Battle of Ctesiphon, under the walls of the Sasanian capital, but is unable to take the city.
1108 – Battle of Uclés: Almoravid troops under the command of Tamim ibn Yusuf defeat a Castile and León alliance under the command of Prince Sancho Alfónsez.
1167 – Battle of Monte Porzio: A Roman army supporting Pope Alexander III is defeated by Christian of Buch and Rainald of Dassel.
1176 – Battle of Legnano: The Lombard League defeats Emperor Frederick I.
1233 – Mongol–Jin War: The Mongols entered Kaifeng after a successful siege and began looting in the fallen capital of the Jin dynasty.
1328 – Philip VI is crowned King of France.
1416 – Battle of Gallipoli: The Venetians under Pietro Loredan defeat a much larger Ottoman fleet off Gallipoli.
1453 – Fall of Constantinople: Ottoman armies under Sultan Mehmed II capture Constantinople after a 53-day siege, ending the Byzantine Empire.

1601–1900
1658 – Battle of Samugarh: decisive battle in the struggle for the throne during the Mughal war of succession (1658–1659).
1660 – English Restoration: Charles II is restored to the throne of England, Scotland and Ireland.
1733 – The right of settlers in New France to enslave natives is upheld at Quebec City.
1780 – American Revolutionary War: At the Battle of Waxhaws, the British continue attacking after the Continentals lay down their arms, killing 113 and critically wounding all but 53 that remained.
1790 – Rhode Island becomes the last of North America's original Thirteen Colonies to ratify the Constitution and become one of the United States.
1798 – United Irishmen Rebellion: Between 300 and 500 United Irishmen are executed as rebels by the British Army in County Kildare, Ireland.
1807 – Mustafa IV became Sultan of the Ottoman Empire and Caliph of Islam.
1848 – Wisconsin is admitted as the 30th U.S. state.
1851 – Sojourner Truth delivers her famous Ain't I a Woman? speech at the Woman’s Rights Convention in Akron, Ohio.
1852 – Jenny Lind leaves New York after her two-year American tour.
1861 – The Hong Kong General Chamber of Commerce is founded, in Hong Kong.
1864 – Emperor Maximilian I of Mexico arrives in Mexico for the first time.
1867 – The Austro-Hungarian Compromise of 1867 ("the Compromise") is born through Act 12, which establishes the Austro-Hungarian Empire.
1868 – Mihailo Obrenović III, Prince of Serbia is assassinated.
1886 – The pharmacist John Pemberton places his first advertisement for Coca-Cola, which appeared in The Atlanta Journal.
1900 – N'Djamena is founded as Fort-Lamy by the French commander Émile Gentil.

1901–present
1903 – In the May Coup, Alexander I, King of Serbia, and Queen Draga, are assassinated in Belgrade by the Black Hand (Crna Ruka) organization.
1913 – Igor Stravinsky's ballet score The Rite of Spring receives its premiere performance in Paris, France, provoking a riot.
1914 – The Ocean liner  sinks in the Gulf of Saint Lawrence with the loss of 1,012 lives.
1918 – Armenia defeats the Ottoman Army in the Battle of Sardarabad.
1919 – Albert Einstein's theory of general relativity is tested (later confirmed) by Arthur Eddington and Andrew Claude de la Cherois Crommelin.
1920 – The Louth flood of 1920 was a severe flash flooding in the Lincolnshire market town of Louth, resulting in 23 fatalities in 20 minutes. It has been described as one of the most significant flood disasters in the United Kingdom during the 20th century.
1931 – Michele Schirru, a citizen of the United States, is executed by a Royal Italian Army firing squad for intent to kill Benito Mussolini.
1932 – World War I veterans begin to assemble in Washington, D.C., in the Bonus Army to request cash bonuses promised to them to be paid in 1945.
1935 – First flight of the Messerschmitt Bf 109 fighter aeroplane.
1945 – First combat mission of the Consolidated B-32 Dominator heavy bomber.
1947 – United Airlines Flight 521 crashes at LaGuardia Airport, killing 43.
1948 – United Nations Truce Supervision Organization is founded.
1950 – The St. Roch, the first ship to circumnavigate North America, arrives in Halifax, Nova Scotia, Canada.
1953 – Edmund Hillary and Sherpa Tenzing Norgay become the first people to reach the summit of Mount Everest, on Tenzing Norgay's (adopted) 39th birthday.
1964 – The Arab League meets in East Jerusalem to discuss the Palestinian question, leading to the formation of the Palestine Liberation Organization.
1964 – Having deposed them in a January coup South Vietnamese leader Nguyễn Khánh had rival Generals Tran Van Don and Le Van Kim convicted of "lax morality".
1973 – Tom Bradley is elected the first black mayor of Los Angeles, California.
1982 – Pope John Paul II becomes the first pontiff to visit Canterbury Cathedral. 
  1982   – Falklands War: the British Army defeats the Argentine Army at the Battle of Goose Green.
1985 – Heysel Stadium disaster: Thirty-nine association football fans die and hundreds are injured when a dilapidated retaining wall collapses.
  1985   – Amputee Steve Fonyo completes cross-Canada marathon at Victoria, British Columbia, after 14 months.
1988 – The U.S. President Ronald Reagan begins his first visit to the Soviet Union when he arrives in Moscow for a superpower summit with the Soviet leader Mikhail Gorbachev.
1989 – Signing of an agreement between Egypt and the United States, allowing the manufacture of parts of the F-16 jet fighter plane in Egypt.
1990 – The Congress of People's Deputies of Russia elects Boris Yeltsin as President of the Russian Soviet Federative Socialist Republic.
1993 – The Miss Sarajevo beauty pageant is held in war-torn Sarajevo drawing global attention to the plight of its citizens.
1999 – Olusegun Obasanjo takes office as President of Nigeria, the first elected and civilian head of state in Nigeria after 16 years of military rule.
  1999   – Space Shuttle Discovery completes the first docking with the International Space Station.
2001 – The U.S. Supreme Court rules that the disabled golfer Casey Martin can use a cart to ride in tournaments.
2004 – The National World War II Memorial is dedicated in Washington, D.C.
2005 – France rejects the Constitution of the European Union in a national referendum. 
2006 – The roof of Porvoo Cathedral  in the town of Porvoo was destroyed by arson.
2008 – A doublet earthquake, of combined magnitude 6.1, strikes Iceland near the town of Selfoss, injuring 30 people.
2012 – A 5.8-magnitude earthquake hits northern Italy near Bologna, killing at least 24 people.
2015 – One World Observatory at One World Trade Center opens.

Births

Pre-1600
1421 – Charles, Prince of Viana (d. 1461)
1443 – Victor, Duke of Münsterberg, Reichsgraf, Duke of Münsterberg and Opava, Count of Glatz (d. 1500)
1504 – Antun Vrančić, Croatian archbishop (d. 1573)
1555 – George Carew, 1st Earl of Totnes, English Earl, general and administrator (d. 1629)
1568 – Virginia de' Medici, Italian princess (d. 1615)
1594 – Gottfried Heinrich Graf zu Pappenheim, Bavarian field marshal (d. 1632)

1601–1900
1627 – Anne, Duchess of Montpensier, French princess (d. 1693)
1630 – Charles II of England (d. 1685)
1675 – Humphry Ditton, English mathematician and philosopher (d. 1715)
1716 – Louis-Jean-Marie Daubenton, French zoologist and mineralogist (d. 1800)
1722 – James FitzGerald, 1st Duke of Leinster, Irish soldier and politician (d. 1773)
1730 – Jackson of Exeter, English organist and composer (d. 1803)
1736 – Patrick Henry, American lawyer and politician, 1st Governor of Virginia (d. 1799)
1780 – Henri Braconnot, French chemist and pharmacist (d. 1855)
1794 – Johann Heinrich von Mädler, German astronomer and selenographer (d. 1874)
1797 – Louise-Adéone Drölling, French painter (d. 1836)
1823 – John H. Balsley, American carpenter and inventor (d. 1895)
1860 – Isaac Albéniz, Spanish pianist and composer (d. 1909)
1871 – Clark Voorhees, American painter (d. 1933)
1873 – Rudolf Tobias, Estonian organist and composer (d. 1918)
1874 – G. K. Chesterton, English essayist, poet, and playwright (d. 1936)
1880 – Oswald Spengler, German historian and philosopher (d. 1936)
1892 – Alfonsina Storni, Swiss-Argentinian poet and author (d. 1938)
1893 – Max Brand, American journalist and author (d. 1944)
1894 – Beatrice Lillie, Canadian-English actress, singer and writer (d. 1989)
  1894   – Josef von Sternberg, Austrian-American director, producer, and screenwriter (d. 1969)
1897 – Erich Wolfgang Korngold, Czech-American pianist, composer, and conductor (d. 1957)
1899 – Douglas Abbott, Canadian lawyer and politician, 10th Canadian Minister of Defence (d. 1987)

1901–present
1902 – Harry Kadwell, Australian rugby league player and coach (d. 1999)
1903 – Bob Hope, English-American actor, singer, and producer (d. 2003)
1904 – Hubert Opperman, Australian cyclist and politician (d. 1996)
1905 – Sebastian Shaw, English actor, director, and playwright (d. 1994)
1906 – T. H. White, Indian-English author (d. 1964)
1907 – Hartland Molson, Canadian captain and politician (d. 2002)
1908 – Diana Morgan, Welsh-English playwright and screenwriter (d. 1996)
1910 – Ralph Metcalfe, American sprinter and politician (d. 1978)
1913 – Tony Zale, American boxer (d. 1997)
1914 – Stacy Keach Sr., American actor (d. 2003)
  1914   – Tenzing Norgay, Nepalese-Indian mountaineer (d. 1986)
1915 – Karl Münchinger, German conductor and composer (d. 1990)
1917 – John F. Kennedy, 35th President of the United States (d. 1963)
  1917   – Marcel Trudel, Canadian historian, author, and academic (d. 2011)
1919 – Jacques Genest, Canadian physician and academic (d. 2018)
1920 – John Harsanyi, Hungarian-American economist and academic, Nobel Prize laureate (d. 2000)
  1920   – Clifton James, American actor (d. 2017)
1921 – Norman Hetherington, Australian cartoonist and puppeteer (d. 2010)
1922 – Joe Weatherly, American race car driver (d. 1964)
  1922   – Iannis Xenakis, Greek-French composer, engineer, and theorist (d. 2001)
1923 – Bernard Clavel, French author (d. 2010)
  1923   – John Parker, 6th Earl of Morley, English colonel and politician, Lord Lieutenant of Devon (d. 2015)
  1923   – Eugene Wright, American jazz bassist (d. 2020)
1924 – Lars Bo, Danish author and illustrator (d. 1999)
  1924   – Miloslav Kříž, Czech basketball player and coach (d. 2013)
  1924   – Pepper Paire, American baseball player (d. 2013)
1926 – Katie Boyle, Italian-English actress and television host (d. 2018)
  1926   – Halaevalu Mataʻaho ʻAhomeʻe, Queen Consort of Tonga (d. 2017)
  1926   – Abdoulaye Wade, Senegalese academic and politician, 3rd President of Senegal
1927 – Jean Coutu, Canadian pharmacist and businessman, founded the Jean Coutu Group
1928 – Freddie Redd, American jazz pianist and composer (d. 2021)
1929 – Harry Frankfurt, American philosopher and academic
  1929   – Peter Higgs, English-Scottish physicist and academic, Nobel Prize laureate
  1929   – Roberto Vargas, Puerto Rican-American baseball player, coach, and manager (d. 2014)
1932 – Paul R. Ehrlich, American biologist and author
  1932   – Richie Guerin, American basketball player and coach
1933 – Helmuth Rilling, German conductor and educator
  1933   – Tarquinio Provini, Italian motorcycle racer (d. 2005)
1934 – Bill Vander Zalm, Dutch-Canadian businessman and politician, 28th Premier of British Columbia
1935 – André Brink, South African author and playwright (d. 2015)
  1935   – Sylvia Robinson, American singer and producer (d. 2011)
1937 – Charles W. Pickering, American lawyer and judge
  1937   – Irmin Schmidt, German keyboard player and composer
  1937   – Alwin Schockemöhle, German show-jumper
  1937   – Harry Statham, American basketball player and coach
1938 – Christopher Bland, English businessman and politician (d. 2017)
  1938   – Fay Vincent, American lawyer and businessman
1939 – Pete Smith, Australian radio and television announcer
  1939   – Al Unser, American race car driver (d. 2021)
1940 – Taihō Kōki, Japanese sumo wrestler, the 48th Yokozuna (d. 2013)
  1940   – Farooq Leghari, Pakistani politician, 8th President of Pakistan (d. 2010)
1941 – Doug Scott, English mountaineer and author (d. 2020)
  1941   – Bob Simon, American journalist (d. 2015)
1942 – Pierre Bourque, Canadian businessman and politician, 40th Mayor of Montreal
  1942   – Kevin Conway, American actor and director (d. 2020)
1943 – Robert W. Edgar, American educator and politician (d. 2013)
1944 – Bob Benmosche, American businessman (d. 2015)
  1944   – Quentin Davies, English soldier and politician, Shadow Secretary of State for Northern Ireland
1945 – Gary Brooker, English singer-songwriter and pianist (d. 2022)
  1945   – Peter Fraser, Baron Fraser of Carmyllie, Scottish lawyer and politician, Solicitor General for Scotland (d. 2013)
  1945   – Julian Le Grand, English economist and author
  1945   – Martin Pipe, English jockey and trainer
  1945   – Joyce Tenneson, American photographer
  1945   – Jean-Pierre Van Rossem, Belgian scholar and author (d. 2018)
1946 – Fernando Buesa, Spanish politician (d. 2000)
1947 – Anthony Geary, American actor
1948 – Michael Berkeley, English composer and radio host
  1948   – Keith Gull, English microbiologist and academic
1949 – Robert Axelrod, American actor and screenwriter (d. 2019)
  1949   – Brian Kidd, English footballer and manager
  1949   – Francis Rossi, English singer-songwriter and guitarist
1950 – Rebbie Jackson, American singer and actress
1953 – Danny Elfman, American singer-songwriter, producer, and actor
1954 – Robert Beaser, American composer and educator
  1954   – Jerry Moran, American lawyer and politician
1955 – Frank Baumgartl, German runner (d. 2010)
  1955   – John Hinckley Jr., American attempted assassin of Ronald Reagan
  1955   – David Kirschner, American animator, producer, and author
  1955   – Gordon Rintoul, Scottish historian and curator
  1955   – Ken Schrader, American race car driver and sportscaster
1956 – Mark Lyall Grant, English diplomat, British Ambassador to the United Nations
  1956   – La Toya Jackson, American singer-songwriter and actress
1957 – Steven Croft, English bishop and theologian
  1957   – Jeb Hensarling, American lawyer and politician
  1957   – Mohsen Makhmalbaf, Iranian film director
1958 – Annette Bening, American actress
  1958   – Juliano Mer-Khamis, Israeli actor, director, and activist (d. 2011)
  1958   – Uwe Rapolder, German footballer and coach
  1958   – Mike Stenhouse, American baseball player and sportscaster
1959 – Rupert Everett, English actor and novelist
  1959   – Mel Gaynor, English drummer
  1959   – Steve Hanley, Irish-English bass player and songwriter
1960 – Thomas Baumer, Swiss economist and academic
  1960   – Mike Freer, English politician
1961 – Melissa Etheridge, American singer-songwriter, guitarist, and activist
  1961   – John Miceli, American drummer
1962 – Fandi Ahmad, Singaporean footballer, coach, and manager
  1962   – Eric Davis, American baseball player
  1962   – Carol Kirkwood, Scottish journalist
  1962   – Chloé Sainte-Marie, Canadian actress and singer
1963 – Blaze Bayley, English singer-songwriter
  1963   – Zhu Jianhua, Chinese high jumper
  1963   – Ukyo Katayama, Japanese race car driver
  1963   – Claude Loiselle, Canadian ice hockey player and manager
1964 – Howard Mills III, American academic and politician
  1964   – Oswaldo Negri Jr., Brazilian race car driver
1966 – Natalie Nougayrède, French journalist
1967 – Noel Gallagher, English singer-songwriter and guitarist
  1967   – Mike Keane, Canadian ice hockey player and coach
  1967   – Steven Levitt, American economist, author, and academic
1968 – Torquhil Campbell, 13th Duke of Argyll, Scottish politician
  1968   – Tate George, American basketball player
  1968   – Jessica Morden, English politician
  1968   – Hida Viloria, American activist
1970 – Natarsha Belling, Australian journalist 
  1970   – Roberto Di Matteo, Italian footballer and manager
1971 – Éric Lucas, Canadian boxer
  1971   – Bernd Mayländer, German race car driver
  1971   – Jo Beth Taylor, Australian television host and actress
  1971   – Rob Womack, English shot putter and discus thrower
1972 – Laverne Cox, American actress and LGBT advocate
  1972   – Bill Curley, American basketball player and coach
  1972   – Simon Jones, English singer and bass player
1973 – Tomoko Kaneda, Japanese voice actress, singer, and radio personality
  1973   – Mark Lee, American guitarist and songwriter
  1973   – Alpay Özalan, Turkish footballer
  1973   – Myf Warhurst, Australian radio and television host
1974 – Steve Cardenas, American martial artist and retired actor
  1974   – Stephen Larkham, Australian rugby player and coach
  1974   – Aaron McGruder, American author and cartoonist
  1974   – Jenny Willott, English politician
1975 – Jason Allison, Canadian ice hockey player
  1975   – Mel B, English singer-songwriter, dancer, and actress
  1975   – Sven Kubis, German footballer
  1975   – Sarah Millican, English comedian
  1975   – Anthony Wall, English golfer
  1975   – Daniel Tosh, American comedian, television host, actor, writer, and executive producer
1976 – Caçapa, Brazilian footballer and manager
  1976   – Jerry Hairston Jr., American baseball player and sportscaster
  1976   – Raef LaFrentz, American basketball player
  1976   – Yegor Titov, Russian footballer
1977 – Massimo Ambrosini, Italian footballer
  1977   – Marco Cassetti, Italian footballer
  1977   – António Lebo Lebo, Angolan footballer
1978 – Pelle Almqvist, Swedish singer-songwriter
  1978   – Sébastien Grosjean, French tennis player
  1978   – Lorenzo Odone, Italian-American adrenoleukodystrophy patient who inspired the 1992 film, Lorenzo's Oil (d. 2008)
  1978   – Adam Rickitt, English singer
1979 – Arne Friedrich, German footballer
  1979   – Brian Kendrick, American wrestler
  1979   – John Rheinecker, American baseball player (d. 2017)
1980 – Ernesto Farías, Argentinian footballer
1981 – Andrey Arshavin, Russian footballer
1982 – Nataliya Dobrynska, Ukrainian heptathlete
  1982   – Matt Macri, American baseball player
  1982   – Kim Tae-kyun, South Korean baseball player
1984 – Carmelo Anthony, American basketball player
  1984   – Nia Jax, Australian-American professional wrestler
  1984   – Funmi Jimoh, American long jumper
  1984   – Andreas Schäffer, German footballer
  1984   – Ina Wroldsen, Norwegian singer and songwriter
1985 – Nathan Horton, Canadian ice hockey player
1987 – Lina Andrijauskaitė, Lithuanian long jumper
  1987   – Issac Luke, New Zealand rugby league player
  1987   – Kelvin Maynard, Dutch footballer (d. 2019)
  1987   – Noah Reid, Canadian actor, producer, and screenwriter
  1987   – Rui Sampaio, Portuguese footballer
1988 – Muath Al-Kasasbeh, Jordanian captain and pilot (d. 2015)
  1988   – Cheng Fei, Chinese gymnast
  1988   – Steve Mason, Canadian ice hockey player
1989 – Ezekiel Ansah, Ghanaian-American football player
  1989   – Diego Barisone, Argentinian footballer (d. 2015)
  1989   – Riley Keough, American model and actress
1990 – Joe Biagini, American baseball pitcher
  1990   – Erica Garner, American civil rights activist (d. 2017)
1991 – Yaime Perez, Cuban discus thrower
1992 – Sarah Moundir, Swiss tennis player
1993 – Jana Čepelová, Slovak tennis player
  1993   – Maika Monroe, American actress and kiteboarder
  1993   – Grete Šadeiko, Estonian heptathlete
1998 – Markelle Fultz, American basketball player
1999 – Park Ji-hoon, South Korean actor and singer

Deaths

Pre-1600
 931 – Jimeno Garcés of Pamplona
1040 – Renauld I, Count of Nevers
1259 – Christopher I of Denmark (b. 1219)
1311 – James II of Majorca (b. 1243)
1320 – Pope John VIII of Alexandria, Coptic pope
1327 – Jens Grand, Danish archbishop (b. c. 1260)
1379 – Henry II of Castile (b. 1334)
1405 – Philippe de Mézières, French soldier and author (b. 1327)
1425 – Hongxi Emperor of China (b. 1378)
1453 – Ulubatlı Hasan, Ottoman commander (b. 1428)
  1453   – Constantine XI Palaiologos, Byzantine emperor (b. 1404)
1500 – Bartolomeu Dias, Portuguese explorer and navigator (b. 1451)
  1500   – Thomas Rotherham, English cleric and minister (b. 1423)
1546 – David Beaton, Scottish cardinal and politician, Lord Chancellor of Scotland (b. 1494)
1593 – John Penry, Welsh martyr (b. 1559)

1601–1900
1660 – Frans van Schooten, Dutch mathematician and academic (b. 1615)
1691 – Cornelis Tromp, Dutch admiral (b. 1629)
1790 – Israel Putnam, American general (b. 1718)
1796 – Carl Fredrik Pechlin, Swedish general and politician (b. 1720)
1814 – Joséphine de Beauharnais, first wife of Napoleon Bonaparte (b. 1763)
1829 – Humphry Davy, English-Swiss chemist and academic (b. 1778)
1847 – Emmanuel de Grouchy, Marquis de Grouchy, French general (b. 1766)
1862 – Franz Mirecki, Polish composer, music conductor, and music teacher (b. 1791)
1866 – Winfield Scott, American general, lawyer, and politician (b. 1786)
1873 – Prince Friedrich of Hesse and by Rhine (b. 1870)
1892 – Bahá'u'lláh, Persian religious leader, founded the Baháʼí Faith (b. 1817)
1896 – Gabriel Auguste Daubrée, French geologist and academic (b. 1814)

1901–present
1903 – Bruce Price, American architect, designed the Château Frontenac and American Surety Building (b. 1845)
1910 – Mily Balakirev, Russian pianist, composer, and conductor (b. 1837)
1911 – W. S. Gilbert, English playwright and poet (b. 1836)
1914 – Laurence Sydney Brodribb Irving, English author and playwright (b. 1871)
  1914   – Henry Seton-Karr, English explorer, hunter, and author (b. 1853)
1917 – Kate Harrington, American poet and educator (b. 1831)
1919 – Robert Bacon, American colonel and politician, 39th United States Secretary of State (b. 1860)
1920 – Carlos Deltour, French rower (b. 1864)
1921 – Abbott Handerson Thayer, American painter and educator (b. 1849)
1935 – Josef Suk, Czech violinist and composer (b. 1874)
1939 – Ursula Ledóchowska, Austrian-Polish nun and saint, founded the Congregation of the Ursulines of the Agonizing Heart of Jesus (b. 1865)
1941 – Léo-Pol Morin, Canadian pianist, composer, and educator (b. 1892)
1942 – John Barrymore, American actor (b. 1882)
1946 – Martin Gottfried Weiss, German SS officer (b. 1905)
1948 – May Whitty, English actress (b. 1865)
1951 – Fanny Brice, American singer and comedian (b. 1891)
  1951   – Dimitrios Levidis, Greek-French soldier and composer (b. 1885)
1953 – Morgan Russell, American painter and educator (b. 1886)
1957 – James Whale, English director (b. 1889)
1958 – Juan Ramón Jiménez, Spanish poet and academic, Nobel Prize laureate (b. 1881)
1963 – Netta Muskett, English author (b. 1887)
1966 – Ignace Lepp, Estonian-French priest and psychologist (b. 1909)
1968 – Arnold Susi, Estonian lawyer and politician, Estonian Minister of Education (b. 1896)
1970 – John Gunther, American journalist and author (b. 1901)
  1970   – Eva Hesse, American artist (b. 1936)
1972 – Moe Berg, American baseball player, coach, and spy (b. 1902)
  1972   – Stephen Timoshenko, Ukrainian-American engineer and academic (b. 1878)
1973 – George Harriman, English businessman (b. 1908)
1977 – Ba Maw, Burmese politician, Prime Minister of Burma (b. 1893)
1979 – Mary Pickford, Canadian-American actress, producer, and screenwriter, co-founder of United Artists (b. 1892)
  1979   – John H. Wood Jr., American lawyer and judge (b. 1916)
1982 – Romy Schneider, German-French actress (b. 1938)
1983 – Arvīds Pelše, Latvian-Russian historian and politician (b. 1899)
1987 – Charan Singh, Indian politician, 5th Prime Minister of India (b. 1902)
1988 – Salem bin Laden, Saudi Arabian businessman (b. 1946)
1989 – George C. Homans, American sociologist and academic (b. 1910)
1991 – Margaret Barr (choreographer), Australian choreographer and teacher of dance-drama (b. 1904)
1993 – Billy Conn, American boxer (b. 1917)
1994 – Erich Honecker, German lawyer and politician (b. 1912)
  1994   – Lady May Abel Smith, member of the British Royal Family (b. 1906)
1996 – Tamara Toumanova, American ballerina and actress (b. 1919)
1997 – Jeff Buckley, American singer-songwriter and guitarist (b. 1966)
1998 – Barry Goldwater, American general, activist, and politician (b. 1909)
2003 – David Jefferies, English motorcycle racer (b. 1972)
2004 – Archibald Cox, American lawyer and politician, 31st United States Solicitor General (b. 1912)
  2004   – Samuel Dash, American academic and politician (b. 1925)
2005 – John D'Amico, Canadian ice hockey player and referee (b. 1937)
  2005   – Hamilton Naki, South African surgeon (b. 1926)
  2005   – George Rochberg, American soldier and composer (b. 1918)
2006 – Jacques Bouchard, Canadian businessman (b. 1930)
2007 – Dave Balon, Canadian ice hockey player and coach (b. 1938)
  2007   – Lois Browne-Evans, Bermudian lawyer and politician (b. 1927)
2008 – Paula Gunn Allen, Native American writer (b. 1939)
  2008   – Luc Bourdon, Canadian ice hockey player (b. 1987)
  2008   – Harvey Korman, American actor and comedian (b. 1927)
2010 – Dennis Hopper, American actor, director, and screenwriter (b. 1936)
2011 – Sergei Bagapsh, Abkhazian politician, 2nd President of Abkhazia (b. 1949)
  2011   – Bill Clements, American soldier and politician, 42nd Governor of Texas (b. 1917)
  2011   – Ferenc Mádl, Hungarian academic and politician, 14th President of Hungary (b. 1931)
2012 – Mark Minkov, Russian composer (b. 1944)
  2012   – Kaneto Shindo, Japanese director, producer, and screenwriter (b. 1912)
  2012   – Doc Watson, American singer-songwriter and guitarist (b. 1923)
2013 – Richard Ballantine, American-English journalist and author (b. 1940)
  2013   – Françoise Blanchard, French actress (b. 1954)
  2013   – Andrew Greeley, American priest, sociologist, and author (b. 1928)
  2013   – Mulgrew Miller, American pianist and composer (b. 1955)
  2013   – Henry Morgentaler, Polish-Canadian physician and activist (b. 1923)
  2013   – Franca Rame,  Italian actress and playwright (b. 1928)
  2013   – Ludwig G. Strauss, German physician and academic (b. 1949)
  2013   – Wali-ur-Rehman, Pakistani commander (b. 1970)
2014 – Christine Charbonneau, Canadian singer-songwriter (b. 1943)
  2014   – Walter Jakob Gehring, Swiss biologist and academic (b. 1939)
  2014   – Peter Glaser, Czech-American scientist and engineer (b. 1923)
  2014   – Miljenko Prohaska, Croatian composer and conductor (b. 1925)
  2014   – William M. Roth, American businessman (b. 1916)
2015 – Henry Carr, American football player and sprinter (b. 1942)
  2015   – Doris Hart, American tennis player (b. 1925)
  2015   – Betsy Palmer, American actress (b. 1926)
2017 – Manuel Noriega, Panamanian general and politician, Military Leader of Panama (b. 1934)
  2017   – Mordechai Tzipori, Israeli Lieutenant General and minister (b. 1924)
  2017   – Konstantinos Mitsotakis, Greek politician and prime minister (b. 1918)
2020 – Maikanti Baru, Nigerian engineer, former chief of state oil firm. (b. 1959)
2021 – Gavin MacLeod, American actor, Christian activist, and author (b. 1931)
  2021   – Mark Eaton, American basketball player and sportscaster (b. 1957)
  2021   – B. J. Thomas, American singer (b. 1942)
2022 – Ronnie Hawkins, American rockabilly singer-songwriter and guitarist.
2022 – Sidhu Moosewala, Indian singer, rapper, actor and politician. (b. 1993)

Holidays and observances
Army Day (Argentina)
 Ascension of Bahá'u'lláh (Baháʼí Faith) (Only if Baháʼí Naw-Rúz falls on March 21 of the Gregorian calendar)
 Christian feast day:
 Bona of Pisa
 Hypomone (Eastern Orthodox Church)
 Maximin of Trier
 Pope Alexander of Alexandria (Eastern Orthodox Church)
 Theodosia of Constantinople (Eastern Orthodox Church)
 Ursula Ledóchowska
 May 29 (Eastern Orthodox liturgics)
 International Day of United Nations Peacekeepers (International)
 National Elderly Day (Indonesia)
 Oak Apple Day (England), and its related observance:
 Castleton Garland Day (Castleton)
 Statehood Day (Rhode Island and Wisconsin)
 Veterans Day (Sweden)

References

External links

 BBC: On This Day
 
 Historical Events on May 29

Days of the year
May